Plasmodium scorzai is a parasite of the genus Plasmodium.

Like all Plasmodium species P. scorzai has both vertebrate and insect hosts. The vertebrate hosts for this parasite are reptiles.

Description 
The parasite was first described by Telford in 1978.

Geographical occurrence 
This species is found in Venezuela.

Clinical features and host pathology 
The only known host of this species is the gekko Phyllodactylus ventralis.

References 

scorzai